The TUM School of Social Sciences and Technology (SOT) is a school of the Technical University of Munich, established in 2021 by the merger of three former departments. As of 2022, it is structured into the Department of Educational Sciences, the Department of Science, Technology and Society, and the Department of Governance.

Department of Educational Sciences 
The Department of Educational Sciences conducts teacher training and education research.

Chairs 
As of 2020, the department consists of following chairs:
 Business Education
 Didactics of Chemistry
 Didactics of Computer Science
 Didactics of Life Sciences
 Educational Psychology
 Formal and Informal Learning
 History of Technology
 Information Search, Ecological and Active Learning Research with Children 
 Mathematics Education
 Methods in Empirical Educational Research
 Personality and Social Psychology
 Research on Learning and Instruction
 Science Communication
 Teaching and Learning with Digital Media
 Technical Education
 Vocational Education

Department of Science, Technology and Society 
The Department of Science, Technology and Society was formed from the former Munich Center for Technology in Society (MCTS) that was established in 2012 as part of the German Universities Excellence Initiative.

As of 2022, research groups at the department include:
 Innovation Research
 Law, Science and Technology
 Philosophy of Science
 History of Technology
 Sociology in Science
 Science and Technology Policy

Department of Governance 
The Department of Governance was formed from the former School of Governance that was established in 2017. It focuses on the interactions among politics, economy, society, and technology.

Institute for Ethics in Artificial Intelligence 
The Institute for Ethics in Artificial Intelligence (IEAI) is a lab of the TUM School of Social Sciences and Technology.

It was established in 2019 to investigate the ethics of artificial intelligence. Christoph Lütge serves as the founding director.

Controversies 
Facebook is funding the institute with a total of €7.5 million over five years. This has been met with significant criticism. The contractual agreement between the university and the US company was kept secret, though the "Facebook Unrestricted Gift Letter" became public. For the grant, the company reserves the right to stop paying out further funding at any time after its payment of an initial margin of $1.5 million, without giving reasons. This was interpreted by politicians and the media as a threat to refrain from publishing unfavorable research results. The agreement also explicitly states that the institute must be led by founding director Christoph Lütge. Lütge holds an endowed chair in business ethics at TUM, endowed by former Siemens executive Peter Löscher. Should the university wish to appoint another institute director, it would require the prior written approval of Facebook.

Alexander Filipović, a professor of media ethics at the Munich School of Philosophy, said that while he was concerned, he trusted the university.

Chris Köver wrote on Netzpolitik.org that after Sheryl Sandberg announced the partnership, many media outlets "from Tagesschau to Süddeutsche Zeitung" immediately reported on the company's commitment to ethics in AI. Köver wrote: "Facebook has bought a comparatively cheap image campaign in the German media landscape this way for 6.6 million euros."

Rankings 

In the QS World University Rankings, TUM is ranked 84th in the world and 2nd in Germany in the subject Education & Training. In the Times Higher Education World University Rankings, TUM is ranked 50th in the world and 2nd in Germany in the subject Education.

References

See also 
 Bavarian School of Public Policy

 
2021 establishments in Germany
Educational institutions established in 2021